Goran Kartalija (born 17 January 1966) is a Yugoslav and Austrian former professional footballer who played as a defender. He is the currently the head coach of Austrian club SV Steyregg.

Career
Born in Kljajićevo, Kartalija made his senior debuts with Vrbas, spending three seasons at the club (1985–1988), before transferring to Vojvodina. He was a regular member of the team that won the 1988–89 Yugoslav First League. In the summer of 1991, Kartalija moved abroad to Austria and signed with Wiener Sport-Club. He later switched to LASK Linz in the 1993 winter transfer window, spending the following four and a half years at the club. During this period, Kartalija acquired Austrian citizenship and started representing the country. He earned four caps for the national team between 1996 and 1997. In the 1997–98 season, Kartalija played for French club Nice, before returning to Austria and joining Admira Wacker Mödling. He subsequently joined Union Weisskirchen in January 1999. After spending three and a half years at the club, Kartalija switched to Union Gunskirchen in July 2002. He later joined Asten and stayed there for five seasons (2003–2008). Afterwards, Kartalija spent three years with St. Valentin from 2008 to 2011, while also serving as player-manager in the last two seasons.

Career statistics

Honours
Vojvodina
 Yugoslav First League: 1988–89

References

External links
 

Living people
1966 births
Association football defenders
Austria international footballers
Austrian expatriate footballers
Austrian expatriate sportspeople in France
Austrian Football Bundesliga players
2. Liga (Austria) players
Austrian football managers
Austrian footballers
Austrian people of Serbian descent
Expatriate footballers in Austria
Expatriate footballers in France
FC Admira Wacker Mödling players
FK Vojvodina players
FK Vrbas players
LASK players
Ligue 2 players
Naturalised citizens of Austria
OGC Nice players
Wiener Sport-Club players
Yugoslav expatriate footballers
Yugoslav expatriates in Austria
Yugoslav First League players
Yugoslav footballers